Shirley Township is an inactive township in Ripley County, in the U.S. state of Missouri.

A variant spelling was "Sherley Township". The township was erected in 1892, taking its name from Frank M. Sherley, an early settler.

References

Townships in Missouri
Townships in Ripley County, Missouri